Helmut Lebert (born 18 February 1941) is a West German rower who represented the United Team of Germany. He competed at the 1964 Summer Olympics in Tokyo with the men's double sculls where they came fifth.

References

1941 births
Living people
German male rowers
Olympic rowers of the United Team of Germany
Rowers at the 1964 Summer Olympics
Sportspeople from Munich